This is a timeline of the Chagatai Khanate (1226–1348) and its successor states, Moghulistan (1347–1462), Yarkent Khanate (1514–1696), and the Turpan Khanate (1462–1680).

12th century

1180s

13th century

1200s

1210s

1220s

1240s

1250s

1260s

1270s

1280s

1290s

14th century

1300s

1310s

1320s

1330s

1340s

1350s

1360s

1370s

1380s

1390s

15th century

1400s

1410s

1420s

1430s

1450s

1460s

1470s

1480s

1490s

16th century

1500s

1510s

1520s

1530s

1540s

1550s

1560s

1570s

1590s

17th century

1610s

1630s

1650s

1660s

1670s

1680s

1690s

See also
Timeline of the Yuan dynasty
Timeline of the Ilkhanate
Timeline of the Golden Horde
Timeline of Mongolian history
Timeline of Mongols prior to the Mongol Empire

References

Bibliography

 .

 (alk. paper) 
 

 

  (paperback).
 

 
 .

 

 
 

 

 

 

 
  
 

 
 

Chagatai Khanate
Chagatai Khanate